Smokestack Lightnin' was an American rock band of the mid-1960s, which frequently played at the famed Sunset Strip club Whisky a Go Go. They appeared in the 1968 film Dreams of Glass and their 1969 album, Off the Wall, gained some respect over the years since the group disbanded in 1970.

References

American rock music groups